Newtown is a hamlet in the parish of Germoe, Cornwall, England.

References

Hamlets in Cornwall